KGEN-FM (94.5 FM) is a radio station broadcasting a Regional Mexican format. It is licensed to Hanford, California, United States, and it serves the Visalia-Tulare area.  The station is owned by Jose Arredondo, through licensee JA Ventures, Inc.

External links

GEN-FM
Mass media in Tulare County, California
GEN-FM
Radio stations established in 1999
1999 establishments in California